Iris Chung (born October 21, 1987), formerly known as Zhong Yonghui, is a model who was born in British Hong Kong. She was the only Hong Kong representative selected for the Tokyo Girls Award in May 2012. Chung has an acting career, starting as the first supporting actress in the movie Mr. & Mrs. Player. She was one of the leading actress of the movie Flirting in the Air.

Filmography

Publications

Others
Tokyo Girls Award  S/S 2012

References

External links
Iris's Official Weibo Blog

1987 births
Living people
Hong Kong film actresses
21st-century Hong Kong actresses